Abortion in West Virginia is illegal, with few exceptions.

The number of clinics in West Virginia has declined steeply from the original nineteen over the years, with ten in 1982, five in 1992, two in 2014, and one in 2017. There were 1,730 legal abortions in 2014, and 1,516 in 2015.

On September 13, 2022, West Virginia passed a near-total abortion ban in both houses of its legislature. Governor Jim Justice signed the bill into law on September 16, 2022.

The near-total ban on abortions is currently being challenged in court.

Legislative and judicial history 
West Virginia's primary abortion statute is a holdover from a Virginia law passed in 1848. The statute reads:

In Roe v. Wade (1973,) the Supreme Court of the United States ruled that states could no longer regulate abortion in the first trimester. (However, the Supreme Court overturned Roe v. Wade in Dobbs v. Jackson Women's Health Organization,  later in 2022.) Following this, the above statute was declared unconstitutional by the Fourth Circuit Court of Appeals in Doe v. Charleston Area Medical Center (1975).

The West Virginia Legislature passed the Women's Right To Know Act in 2002, requiring abortion providers to read a counselling script to women seeking an abortion. These materials include details on fetal development by week and a list of "psychological risks" of the procedure, including guilt, depression, suicidal thoughts or acts, and "chronic relationship problems". Earlier editions of the script labelled the psychological risks as "post-traumatic stress disorder", in addition to containing scientifically unsupported warnings about a link between abortion and breast cancer.

In March 2015, the West Virginia legislature overrode a veto from governor Earl Ray Tomblin to pass "The Pain-Capable Unborn Child Protection Act", outlawing abortions more than 20 weeks into a pregnancy.

West Virginia requires parental consent for a minor to receive an abortion. Historically, this could be avoided by a waiver from a physician; in 2017, HB2002 was enacted, requiring the physician's waiver to also be approved by a judge.

On September 13, 2022, West Virginia passed a near-total abortion ban in both houses of its legislature. Governor Jim Justice signed the bill into law on September 16, 2022.

Clinic history 

The Women's Health Center of West Virginia opened in 1976. Between 1982 and 1992, the number of abortion clinics in the state declined by five, going from ten in 1982 to five in 1992. In 1998, 96% of the counties in the state lacked an abortion clinic.

In 2014, there were two abortion clinics in the state. In 2014, 98% of the counties in the state did not have an abortion clinic. That year, 90% of women in the state aged 15–44 lived in a county without an abortion clinic. In 2017, only about 20% of all patients at the Women's Health Center of West Virginia went seeking abortion services. Women came from Ohio and Kentucky to utilize their services. Few came from Virginia, which had more clinics providing abortion services. In 2017, there was only one Planned Parenthood clinic in a state with a population of 392,351 women aged 15–49 and it did not provide abortion services. North Dakota, Wyoming, Mississippi, Louisiana, Kentucky, and West Virginia were the only six states as of July 21, 2017, not to have a Planned Parenthood clinic that offered abortion services. In January 2017, Kanawha Surgicenter shut down after the doctor running the clinic moved to California, leaving the state with only one operating abortion clinic. In May 2019, the state was one of six states in the nation with only one abortion clinic.

Statistics 
In the period between 1972 and 1974, there were zero recorded illegal abortion deaths in the state. In 1990, 179,000 women in the state faced the risk of an unintended pregnancy. In 2013, among white women aged 15–19, there were 230 abortions, 40 abortions for black women aged 15–19, 0 abortions for Hispanic women aged 15–19, and 0 abortions for women of all other races. In 2014, only 35% of West Virginians in a poll approved of legalized abortion in most or all situations. In 2016, only four minors had abortions that bypassed parental consent by getting a waiver. In 2017, the state had an infant mortality rate of 7.0 deaths per 1,000 live births.

Public opinion 
As of 2014, 35% of citizens in West Virginia state that abortion should be legal in most or all cases, while 58% say it should be illegal in most or all cases.  
As of 2022, 40% of citizens in West Virginia state that abortion should be legal in most or all cases, while 55% say it should be illegal in most or all cases.

Abortion financing 
Since 2018 West Virginia covers abortion only in case of rape, incest, or life endangerment. Before 2018 West Virginia used their own funds to cover all or most "medically necessary" abortions sought by low-income women under Medicaid. In 2010, the state had 1,111 publicly funded abortions, of which all were state funded and none were federally funded.

Abortion rights views and activities

Protests 
Women from the state participated in marches supporting abortion rights as part of a #StoptheBans movement in May 2019.

References 

West Virginia
Healthcare in West Virginia
Women in West Virginia